Luis Val (born 17 October 1959) is an Australian judoka. He competed in the men's half-middleweight event at the 1988 Summer Olympics.

References

External links
 
 
 

1959 births
Living people
Australian male judoka
Olympic judoka of Australia
Judoka at the 1988 Summer Olympics
Place of birth missing (living people)